Sassona Norton  (born 26 February 1942) is an Israeli-born American sculptor.

Early life 
Norton was born and raised in Israel. She graduated from Tel Aviv University with a degree in Literature and Theatre. She went on to teach literature in high school, directed  and produced theatrical events and wrote about film, theater and art for Yediot Achronot, one of Israel largest  newspapers. Norton painted from her early age and took it on seriously in her late teens, when she studied privately with several well-known Israeli painters. In her mid-twenties, after showing at several group shows, Norton had a first solo of her large scale paintings of abstracted figures at Gallery 220 in Tel Aviv.  The show was praised by the Jerusalem Post for creating “3-D spaces populated with tension and lyricism”. Norton immigrated to the United States in 1974 and joined the Art Students League of New York, where she was awarded the Isabel Bishop Merit Scholarship.

Career 
Norton began to achieve artistic success in the early 1980s, first with the publication of her work A Yellow Night, in Twentieth Century Masters of Erotic Art by Crown Publishers, alongside works by Picasso, Rodin, Calder, and Dali. In 1981, she was chosen for Eight Young New Yorkers on the Horizon. In 1983, her large-scale painting The Rain Prayer was published in the Discover Art series by Laura H. Chapman. In 1984, Norton's solo show at Sutton Gallery in New York City was praised by the critic Peter Fingesten for its "vision and strength".

In 1999 Norton shifted from painting to sculpting after working in architectural and design installation projects. She was awarded the Huntington Merit Medal for her sculpture The Edge of Rest at the National Arts Club in New York in 2002. In 2003 she sculpted the largest September 11th Memorial in Pennsylvania, costing $200,000. The memorial, close to twenty-feet tall, was installed in Norristown in 2005. In 2006, the Morris Museum in New Jersey held a major show of her sculptures, which was extended by popular demand for over six months. In connection with the show, the museum published Sassona Norton Sculpture. The hard-cover book included essays by Steve Miller, the Museum Director, Hilarie Sheets of the New York Times and Ann Landi of Artnews. In 2008, "A Memorial Journey", the documentary about the making of the 9/11 Memorial, was shown at the International Art Fair in Stockholm.

In 2011, the Ljungqvist Foundation for anti-doping in Sweden selected Norton out of eight sculptors in Europe and the U.S. to create a monument for anti-doping in sport. The monument is planned as an edition of twenty for major cities around the world.  In 2016, Norton created a series of 20 large posters depicting a bronze hand in a gesture of winning with a gold ring on the index tip to indicate purity rising. The posters raised the hand on different sculpted bases.

In 2016 Norton was invited to show her sculpture, An Hour Before Dawn, at the Workhouse Arts Center, AKA The Prison Museum, in Lorton, Virginia. The sculpture was chosen as an icon for the Suffragists' Centennial to commemorate their imprisonment and torture during the Night of Terror at the former Lorton Reformatory.

In 2017 Norton accepted the invitation to serve as a Trustee on the Board of the Morris Museum in Morristown NJ.

In 2019, Norton's sculpture “An Hour Before  Dawn”, purchased by Craig Ponzio of Colorado in 2006, was selected as the face of the upcoming show of his signature collection at the Denver Botanic Gardens in Denver, Colorado. In addition to Sassona Norton, the exhibition included sculptures by Auguste Rodin, Jacques Lipchitz, Beverly Pepper, Rufino Tamayo, Manolo Valdés and Eric Fischl. The show, "Human | Nature: Figures from the Craig Ponzio Sculpture Collection", ran from April 19 to September 15, 2019.

Sculpting the monument of anti-doping in sport, which had been renamed Et Purus, started in 2019. Et Purus One, the first in the edition of twenty, was designated for Monaco, and it was completed  in the summer of 2021. It was installed in Monte Carlo on Jeteé Lucciana, which juts into the Mediterranean and borders the famous Monaco Yacht Harbor. The unveiling was hosted by Albert II, Prince of Monaco in the presence of international sports dignitaries and the media. Plans are made to install Et Purus No. 2 in Stockholm in the fall of 2022.

Norton is a member of the Royal Society of Sculptors, the National Sculpture Society, the International Sculpture Center, the Washington Sculptors Group and the Sculptors Guild, where she served on the Board.

Collections 
Henry Buhl, New York
Ivan Greenstein, New Jersey
Wu Han and David Finckel, artistic directors of the Chamber Music Society of Lincoln Center, New York
The Ambassador Swaenee Hunt, Massachusetts
Lee Longell, New Jersey
Peter Migliorato, Florida
Sally Minard & Norton Garfinkel, New York
Harry & Lynn O'Mealia, Maryland
Elizabeth Palay & Ed Feige, Wisconsin
Craig Ponzio, "Art Investments", Colorado
Mike McKool, McKool Smith, chairman, Texas
Morris Museum, New Jersey
Haya Horowitz, Israel
Dr.and Mrs. Moshe Shike, New York
Nathan and Karen Shike, London

Personal life 
Norton was married to Dr. Reed Whittle, a psychotherapist and international management consultant to leaders of Fortune 500 companies, until he died on August 12, 2008, from complications related to Sweet's syndrome. In 2020, Norton married Dr. Ron Filler, the founder of Drug Development Consultants. She owns an estate in Bedminster, New Jersey and also an apartment on the Upper East Side of Manhattan.

Philanthropy 
Norton and Filler are patrons of the National Museum of Women in the Arts, the Museum of Modern Art, the Newark Museum, The Discovery Orchestra, the Morris Museum and the Chamber Music Society of Lincoln Center in New York, where Norton has served on the Global Council since 2018.

Norton is a registered Democrat and has contributed financially to Coalition for Progress and Hillary For America. In 2016 she donated over $12,700 to the Democratic Party.

References 

Living people
1942 births
American women sculptors
American women painters
Art Students League of New York alumni
Israeli painters
Israeli women painters
Israeli sculptors
Israeli emigrants to the United States
Jewish American artists
Jewish Israeli artists
Jewish women painters
Jewish painters
Jewish women sculptors
New Jersey Democrats
People from Bedminster, New Jersey
People from Tel Aviv
Tel Aviv University alumni
Yedioth Ahronoth people
Sculptors from New York (state)
21st-century American women artists
21st-century American Jews